"Hey Girl" is a song written and composed by Gerry Goffin and Carole King. It first became a popular Top ten hit on the Billboard Hot 100 in August 1963 when recorded by Freddie Scott. Donny Osmond took the song back to the Billboard top ten chart with his cover in 1971. Billy Joel recorded a version of the song for his 1997 album Greatest Hits Volume III.

Chart performance 
Scott's version peaked at number ten on both the Billboard Hot 100 pop singles and R&B charts.

Donny Osmond version

Background
Donny Osmond released a version of this song on November 6, 1971.  It reached No. 9 on the Billboard Hot 100 on January 15, 1972. It was certified Gold by the RIAA on July 28, 1972.

Chart performance

Certifications

Chart performance

Billy Joel version
In 1997, "Hey Girl" was one of three cover songs Billy Joel included on his album Greatest Hits Volume III. In an interview for Billboard, Joel said of the song, "I recorded that song a few years ago. I had split up with Christie [Brinkley] and my daughter was going to live far away, and I was very sad. When I sang that song, that's who I was singing it to, my little girl."

References

External links
 Nichelle Nichols's 1967 cover as "Hey Boy" provided to YouTube by Sony Music Entertainment.

1963 singles
Donny Osmond songs
Carole King songs
Soul songs
Songs with lyrics by Gerry Goffin
Songs written by Carole King
1997 singles
Columbia Records singles
1963 songs